Cuckney is a village and former civil parish, now in the parish of Norton and Cuckney, in the Bassetlaw district of Nottinghamshire, England, located between Worksop and Market Warsop.

The A60 road connects Market Warsop and Cuckney via Cuckney Hill. The civil parish was merged with Norton to form Norton and Cuckney.

History
The grounds of Cuckney Parish Church, a Grade I listed building, contain the remains of Cuckney Castle.

George Sitwell, Ironmaster mined iron locally and he built a blast furnace here in the seventeenth century.

In 1853 there were two large watermills on the river Poulter in Cuckney, one for cotton, another for corn. An earlier cotton mill had burnt down in 1792.

The school
The upstream mill is now a primary school. Cuckney Church of England Primary School has 140 pupils on its roll.

References

External links
Link about Cuckney

Villages in Nottinghamshire
Former civil parishes in Nottinghamshire
Bassetlaw District